Jiu Bridge is a historic truss bridge across the Jiu River.  It consisted of five arches mounted on pillars and connected two parts of the city of Târgu Jiu, Romania, where the streets Unirii and Calea Severinului meet.

At the end of the 20th century, three of the original five arches have been moved one kilometer north from their initial location, to form a shorter bridge that connects Târgu Jiu Central park with an artificial island on the Jiu river.

History 
The bridge was built in 1896 by the company Daydé & Pillé of Paris (now part of Eiffel Constructions métalliques).

During World War I, on October 14/27, 1916, heavy fighting took place for the control of the bridge between the German Alpen Korps of general Falkenhayn and Romanian military forces assisted by the local population.

Image gallery

See also 
List of bridges in Romania

References 

Bridges in Romania
Bridges completed in 1896
Truss bridges